The Astana Arena is a football stadium in Astana, Kazakhstan. The stadium holds 30,000 and has a retractable roof. It serves as the national stadium for the Kazakhstan national football team. Astana Arena is the largest stadium in the country and it was built from 2006 to 2009 at a cost of $185 million, and was officially opened on 3 July 2009. It is also a home ground for FC Astana of the Kazakhstan Premier League and FC Bayterek of the Kazakhstan First Division. The stadium hosted the opening ceremony of the 7th Asian Winter Games on 31 January 2011. Astana Arena was one of the venues to bid to host UEFA Euro 2020 matches.

History

Construction of the Astana Arena began in 2006 which, on the official opening day, was named Kazhymukan Stadium in honor of the famous wrestler Kazhymukan Munaitpasov. Later, the stadium received its current name Astana Arena. The stadium was designed by leading sports architects Populous in association with Tabanlioglu Architects. The general contractor was Sembol Construction. It was opened with the Lokomotiv Astana match against the Kazakhstan national under-21 football team on July 3, 2009. The famous Italian referee Pierluigi Collina officiated, the symbolic first kick off was by the President of Kazakhstan Nursultan Nazarbayev. As part of each team, in addition to their regular players, two "stars" were invited: the youth national team of Kazakhstan had the Georgian defender Kakha Kaladze and Ukrainian striker Andriy Shevchenko, and Lokomotiv Astana had Turkish players Hasan Şaş and Hakan Şükür.

On October 14, 2009, the stadium hosted its first official international match: the national team of Kazakhstan met the national team of Croatia as part of the qualifying tournament for the 2010 World Cup. The match was won 2-1 by the guests, the decisive goal was scored only in injury time.

On January 31, 2011, Astana Arena hosted the opening ceremony of the 7th Asian Winter Games and the only Muz-TV Channel Awards held outside Moscow.

On June 27, 2017 and June 29, 2019 world stars Dimash Kudaibergen "Bastau" and "Arnau" performed in concerts which attracted 30,000 and 40,000 spectators. 13,500 spectators from 65 countries attended the "Arnau" concert.

In February 2020, the Astana Arena, the glass roof inserts collapsed under the load of snow and ice weighing tons; it eventually fell into the hall. No-one was injured.

Characteristics

The 30,000-seat stadium was conceived as a large amphitheater with a distinctive and instantly recognizable form when viewed from a distance and from close proximity. Essentially a two·tiered structure, the lower terrace, accommodating 16,000 seats, encircles the playing area while the upper stand on the east and west sides seats a further 14,000 spectators. There is effective separation of VIPs, spectators and players to ensure smooth access. All spectators are seated and have a clear sight line with an unobstructed view of the field of play. The playing surface is covered in a high quality grass surface specified to meet FIFA and UEFA criteria. The grass can be covered for other events.

Design
The stadium, designed on an elliptic form, is constructed on a 232,485 m² (330m x 704.5m) rectangular site. The design introduces innovative solutions adopting high technology principles for operational management, interaction with the environment and especially with harsh climatic conditions of the geography.

References

External links
 Official website (archived)

Retractable-roof stadiums
FC Astana
Football venues in Kazakhstan
Sports venues in Astana
Sports venues completed in 2009